Elvira Wood (born 21 September 1973 in Pongola, KwaZulu-Natal) is a South African sabre fencer. At age thirty-four, Wood made her official debut for the 2008 Summer Olympics in Beijing, where she competed in two sabre events. She is also the wife of Mike Wood, who qualified for the men's épée at these Olympic games.

For her first event, the women's individual sabre, Wood lost the first preliminary match to Canada's Sandra Sassine, with a score of 2–15. Few days later, she joined with her fellow fencers and teammates Shelley Gosher, Jyoti Chetty and Adele du Plooy, for the women's team sabre. Wood and her team, however, lost the seventh place match to the Canadian team (led by Sassine), with a total score of 16 touches.

References

External links
Profile – FIE
NBC Olympics profile

1973 births
South African female sabre fencers
Fencers at the 2008 Summer Olympics
Olympic fencers of South Africa
White South African people
People from uPhongolo Local Municipality
Living people